The Breath of Scandal is a 1924 American silent drama film directed by Louis J. Gasnier and starring Betty Blythe, Patsy Ruth Miller, and Jack Mulhall. It is based on the 1922 novel of the same title by Edwin Balmer.

Cast

Preservation
With no prints of The Breath of Scandal located in any film archives, it is a lost film.

References

Bibliography
Robert B. Connelly. The Silents: Silent Feature Films, 1910-36, Volume 40, Issue 2. December Press, 1998.

External links

1924 films
1924 drama films
1920s English-language films
American silent feature films
Silent American drama films
Films directed by Louis J. Gasnier
American black-and-white films
Preferred Pictures films
1920s American films